Thomas Marc Parrott (1866–1960) was a prominent twentieth-century American literary scholar, long a member of the faculty of Princeton University in New Jersey.

Life and work
T. M. Parrott was born and raised in Ohio, the son of Col. Edwin A. Parrott, Civil War veteran, politician (Speaker of the lower house of the Ohio state legislature, 1866–7), and centenarian. The younger Parrott graduated from the College of New Jersey, later known as Princeton, in 1888, and was head of the preparatory department of Miami University from 1888-1890.  At Miami, he was considered part of the "dude faculty" of young eastern professors brought to the school upon its reopening after a twelve-year hiatus.  He is one of the men credited with bringing football to Miami where intercollegiate play began in 1888 against the University of Cincinnati.  He earned his Ph.D. from the University of Leipzig in 1893. His thesis was on the non-dramatic poems of Robert Browning. Parrott became assistant professor of English at Princeton in 1896, and full professor at the same institution in 1902. He remained there for the next three decades.

Parrott wrote and published voluminously on a wide range of subjects in English literature, though his special areas of interest were English Renaissance theatre and Victorian literature; he also published on eighteenth-century figures like Samuel Johnson and Alexander Pope. Parrott wrote many books and journal articles on Shakespeare and other Elizabethans; perhaps his most valuable contribution lies in his work on the canon of George Chapman. Parrott edited the comedies and tragedies of Chapman (1910–14), an edition that is still valuable a century after it was first published.

Selected works
 The Greater Victorian Poets (1901)
 The World's Great Woman Novelists (1901)
 Samuel Johnson, Philosopher and Autocrat (1903)
 The Authorship of "Sir Giles Goosecappe" (1906)
 The Date of Chapman's "Bussy D'Ambois" (1908)
 William Shakespeare: A Handbook (1934)
 Hamlet on the Stage (1953)
 Shakespearean Comedy (1949)

See also
Ursula Parrott

References
 Craig, Hardin, ed. Essays in Dramatic Literature: The Parrott Presentation Volume: By Pupils of Professor Thomas Marc Parrott of Princeton University, Published in his Honor. Princeton, NJ, Princeton University Press, 1937.
 Logan, Terence P., and Denzell S. Smith, eds. The New Intellectuals: A Survey and Bibliography of Recent Studies in English Renaissance Drama. Lincoln, NE, University of Nebraska Press, 1977.

External links

American literary critics
Princeton University faculty
1866 births
1960 deaths
Miami University faculty